Baithak or Bethak, is a site considered sacred by the followers of the Pushtimarg tradition of Vaishnava Hinduism in India for performing devotional rituals. These sites are associated with Vallabhacharya Mahaprabhu, the founder of Pushtimarg and his descendants. They mark public events in their lives. Some of them are restricted or foreboding. These sites are spread across India and are chiefly concentrated in Braj region in Uttar Pradesh and in western state of Gujarat. Total 142 Baithaks are considered sacred; 84 of Vallabhacharya, 28 of his son Viththalanath Gusainji and 30 of his seven grandsons.

Baithaks
Vallabhacharya Mahaprabhu was the founder of Pushtimarg who lived in 15th century. From the young age, he travelled and visited pilgrimage sites across India. He recited and gave discourses on sacred scriptures like Vedas, Ramayana and Bhagavata at these sites. The locations for recitation were usually banks of the rivers or lakes and quite groves in outskirt of towns. He recited original texts from scriptures as well as gave commentaries on them. Later these commentaries were compiled in Anubhashya and Subodhini.

These are 84 sites where Vallabhacharya gave discourses which are known as Baithaks. Later small shrines are built to commemorate the event at some sites. Some sites do not have shrines or temples to mark the place but they are known only through stories and texts.

At these shrines, the hand-written manuscripts and personal artifacts of Vallabhacharya are housed which are revered by the followers. They generally don't house images. Personal use products like clothes and ornaments are offered by the followers. Only water and sugar crystals are offered as Vallabhacharya used to fast during sacred recitals. They too follow seven darshan schedule followed in Vaishnava Haveli temples.

His descendants also gave discourses at various places and established their Baithaks.

Mahaprabhu Vallabhacharya's 84 Baithaks

These 84 Baithaks are located from Rameswaram at the southern tip of India to Badrinath in the north, and from Narayan Sarovar and Bet Dwarka in west to Puri in the east. Baithaks are also located at the places associated with his life such as at Tirumala Tirupati, the family's tutelary deity; Champaran, his birthplace; Varanasi where he spent significant part of his life. Baithaks are also located in the regions highly associated with Krishna such as in Braj region (now roughly corresponding to Mathura district of Uttar Pradesh) and in Dwarka in Gujarat.

Vallabhkula Baithaks
Many Baithaks of Vallabhkula, the descendants of the Vallabhacharya are at the sites of Baithaks of Vallabhacharya. This Baithaks are sanctified by Viththalnath Gusainji and his seven sons. 28 Baithaks are associated with Gusainji Viththalnath while 30 more Baithaks are associated with his seven sons.

They are as follows:

28 Baithaks of Gusainji Viththalnath, younger son of Vallabhacharya

 4 Baithaks of Giridharji, the eldest son of Viththalanath

Gokul
Jatipura, in Mathuraji temple near Gosainji's Baithak
caves of Kamara hill
Narisevan, near Dauji's temple

 1 Baithak of Balkrishnalalji, third son of Viththalnath

Gokul in Dwarakadhish temple

13 Baithaks of Gokulnathji, fourth son of Viththalnath – 13 Baithaks

 1 Baithak of Raghunathji, fifth son of Viththalnath

Gokul

 1 Baithak of Ghanshyamji, youngest son of Viththalnath

Gokul

 7 Baithaks of Harirai Mahaprabhu

Gokul, in the Vithalnath's temple.
Nathadwara, in the temple of Vithalnath
Khamanor
Jaisalmer, on the banks of Gomati river
Sawali, near lake
Jambusar, near lake

 3 Baithaks of Damodardas Harsani, devotee of Vallabhacharya

Thakaranighat in Gokul
Bansighat in Vrindavan
Khambhalia, near Mahaprabhu's Baithak

References

Vaishnavism
Hindu pilgrimage sites in India